Cumberland was a provincial electoral district in Nova Scotia, Canada, that, at the time of its dissolution, elected two members to the Nova Scotia House of Assembly. The district existed from 1867 until 1949, when the County of Cumberland was divided into three electoral districts: Cumberland East, Cumberland West and Cumberland Centre.

Members of the Legislative Assembly 
Except for a brief period from 1916-1933 when it elected three members, Cumberland almost always elected two members to the Nova Scotia Legislature.

Cumberland elected the following members to the Legislative Assembly:  

* NB During the election of 1874, claims of collusion and ballot stuffing were made, which resulted in 3 members being elected on behalf of Cumberland County. After investigation, however, along with public pressure, Amos Purdy resigned his seat, returning the district to their normal 2-member representation in the House.

Election results

1867 general election

1871 general election

1874 general election

1878 general election

1882 general election

1886 general election

1890 general election

1894 general election

1897 general election

1901 general election

1906 general election

1911 general election

1916 general election

1920 general election

1925 general election

1928 general election

1933 general election

1937 general election

1941 general election

1945 general election

References

Former provincial electoral districts of Nova Scotia